Warda is an unincorporated community in northern Fayette County, Texas, United States the area became settled in 1854 by the Wends of Texas. Although it is unincorporated, Warda maintains a post office, with the ZIP code 78960.

References

External links
 WARDA, TX Handbook of Texas Online.

Unincorporated communities in Fayette County, Texas
Unincorporated communities in Texas